The FKF President's Cup (known as the Betway Shield cup for sponsorship reasons) is the top knockout tournament in Kenyan football. It was created in 1956, but during its existence the knockout tournament has had different names. It is the Kenyan equivalent to the FA Cup.
In 2003 two different cup competition's were held in Kenya because the 4 semi-finalists of the President's Cup withdrew from the KFF and continued with their "Transparency Cup" while the KFF continued their tournament with already eliminated clubs.
The 2020 edition was halted due to the COVID-19 pandemic, just an year after Betway betting firm were announced as the title sponsors

Winners

Notes

References

External links
 RSSSF – Kenya - List of Cup Winners

 
Football competitions in Kenya
National association football cups